The Seventh Gate (1994) is a fantasy novel by American writers Margaret Weis and Tracy Hickman, the seventh and final book in their  Death Gate Cycle series.

Plot summary
Alfred, Haplo, and Marit journey to attempt to close the Chamber of the Damned on Abarrach -- it is the Seventh Gate, a portal between worlds. Encountering magical enemies such as dragon-snakes, as the story progresses they battle ferociously. Eventually, they realise that the only way to seal the gate is to work a powerful, peaceful spell together, Sartan with Patryn. At length, this succeeds -- the gate is sealed, and there is some hope of peace. The Patryns and Sartan remain living together in the Labyrinth.

Reception
 
The book hit the bestseller lists for Waldenbooks and B. Dalton.

The Seventh Gate reached 14 on the New York Times bestseller list on August 28, 1994.

References

1994 American novels
Novels by Margaret Weis
Novels by Tracy Hickman
The Death Gate Cycle novels